This is a list of ancient Roman public baths (thermae).

Urban baths

Algeria
 Timgad
 Guelma (Calama)
 Héliopolis
 Hammam Meskoutine (Aquae Tibilitanae)
 Hammam Righa (Aquae Calidae)
 Hammam Essalihine (Aquae Flavianae)

Austria
 Carnuntum

Bulgaria
 Kyustendil (Pautalia)
 Roman Thermae, Varna (Odessus)
 Hisarya (Augusta Diocletianopolis)
 Sozopol

Croatia
 Varaždinske Toplice (Aquae Iasae)
 Daruvar (Aquae Balissae)
 Topusko

France
 Arles – Thermes de Constantin
 Aix-en-Provence (Aquae Sextiae)
 Bagnères-de-Luchon (Onesiorum Thermae of Strabo)
 Cimiez (Cemenelum)
 Glanum, near today's Saint-Rémy-de-Provence
 Lillebonne (Juliobona)
 Metz (Divodurum Mediomatricorum) - Thermes de Metz
 Paris – Thermes de Cluny
 Plombières-les-Bains – Calodae
 Saintes, Charente-Maritime (Mediolanum Santonum)

Germany
 Baden-Baden, Baden-Württemberg
 Trier Imperial Baths, Barbara Baths, and Forum Baths in Trier, Germany
 Weißenburg

Hungary
 Aquincum

Israel
 Avdat
 Ashkelon
 Beit She'an
 Caesarea Maritima
 Ir Ovot
 Jerusalem
 Mamshit
 Masada
 Nazareth

Italy
 Bagnaccio
 Baths at Ostia 
 Baths of Agrippa
 Baths of Caracalla
 Terme dell'Indirizzo, Catania
 Baths of Diocletian
 Baths of Titus
 Baths of Trajan
 Chieti (Teate Marrucinorum), Abruzzo
 Fiesole
 Herculaneum
 Pompeii (ruins)
 Baths of Puteoli
 Terme Taurine

Lebanon
 Roman Baths, Beirut, Beirut

Libya
 Leptis Magna – Hadrian's baths

North Macedonia
Strumica (Tiveriopolis)

Malta
Għajn Tuffieħa Roman Baths
Ta' Bista Catacombs and Roman baths
Xemxija Roman Baths
Xaghra Ramla l-Hamra Roman Baths (Gozo)

The Netherlands
 Heerlen
 Maastricht – Op de Thermen

Portugal
 Chaves
 Évora
 Roman Thermae of Maximinus

Romania
 Băile Herculane

Spain
 Caldes de Malavella, Gerona
 Caldes de Montbui, Barcelona 
 Clunia, Province of Burgos
 Lucus Augusti, Lugo
 Baetulo, Badalona, Barcelona
 Empúries, Girona
 Roman baths of Toledo

Tunisia 
 Dougga – Bath of the Cyclopses (ruins)
 Dougga – Antonian Bath (ruins)
 Dougga – Aïn Doura Bath (ruins)
 Tunis (Carthage) – Baths of Antoninus

Turkey
 Ankara – Baths of Ancyra (ruins)

United Kingdom
 Bath – Roman Baths
 Cheapside Baths, in London
 Exeter, Devon
 Huggin Hill Baths, in London
 Leicester – Jewry Wall
 Ribchester, in Lancashire
 Tripontium, near today's Rugby, Warwickshire
 Welwyn, Hertfordshire – Welwyn Roman Baths

Military bathhouses
 Roman Britain
 Bearsden, Greater Glasgow area, Scotland
 Prestatyn, Wales
 Ravenglass, Cumbria – Roman Bath House
 Vindolanda, Little Chesters, near Hadrian's Wall
 York – Roman Bath

Roman Britain villas with bathhouse
 Chedworth Roman Villa
 Fishbourne Roman Palace
 Wymondley Roman Villa

References

 
Baths